Lake Tohopekaliga, Tohopeka (from tohopke  meaning fence, fort); Tohopekaliga  (from tohopke  meaning fence, fort + likv  meaning site), also referred to as Lake Toho, West Lake, or simply Toho, is the 
largest lake in Osceola County, Florida, United States. It is the primary inflow of Shingle Creek, which rises in Orlando. It is linked to East Lake Tohopekaliga by Canal 31 (St. Cloud Canal). South Port canal is located at the southern tip of the lake and links it to Cypress Lake. Lake Toho is bordered on the northern shore by Kissimmee, on the eastern shore by Kissimmee Park, and South Port on the southern shore. Lake Tohopekaliga is known for its bass fishing and birdwatching. Lakefront Park is located at the North end of the lake and borders Lakeshore Blvd. Lakefront Park has a scenic walking path with benches where visitors may view the area's wide array of waterfowl, alligators, turtles and others. Lakefront park also has a miniature lighthouse, a children's playground area, and is bordered on its west end by Big Toho Marina.

See also

 East Lake Tohopekaliga
 Kissimmee, Florida

References

External links

Tohopekaliga
Tohopekaliga